Beya may refer to:
Heya (sumo), an organization of sumo wrestlers (pronounced beya in compound form)
Beya (rural locality), a rural locality (selo) in the Republic of Khakassia, Russia